John Damore ((born October 20, 1933) is a former professional American football player who played professionally as an offensive lineman for two seasons in the National Football League (NFL) with the Chicago Bears.

References

1933 births
Living people
American football offensive linemen
Chicago Bears players
Northwestern Wildcats football players
People from Riverside, Illinois
Sportspeople from Cook County, Illinois
Players of American football from Illinois